Titanosticta is a genus of damselflies in the family Isostictidae. There is one described species in Titanosticta, T. macrogaster.

References

Further reading

 
 
 

Isostictidae
Articles created by Qbugbot